Brad Phillips (born 25 December 1987) is a South African former soccer player who played as a left-back. He played for Bidvest Wits in the Premier Soccer League.

Phillips trained with the Wits youth team and in 2010 was promoted to the first team. He scored a goal on a free kick in the 2010 season opener against reigning champions SuperSport United.

By 2013, Phillips had fallen out of favour and his contract was not renewed. However, he continued training with the Wits reserves after making only a handful of first-team appearances.

References

1987 births
South African soccer players
Living people
Association football defenders
Soccer players from Johannesburg
White South African people
Bidvest Wits F.C. players
South African Premier Division players